Graham Buckley (born 1 October 1963) is a retired Scottish footballer who played in the Scottish League for Cowdenbeath, Brechin City, Arbroath and Berwick Rangers as a forward.

Personal life 
Buckley has worked as a postman.

Honours
Cowdenbeath

 Scottish League Second Division second-place promotion: 1991–92

Individual

Cowdenbeath Hall of Fame

References

1963 births
Scottish footballers
Living people
Association football forwards
Footballers from Edinburgh
Cowdenbeath F.C. players
Dunfermline Athletic F.C. players
Berwick Rangers F.C. players
Scottish Football League players
Brechin City F.C. players
Livingston F.C. non-playing staff
Cowdenbeath F.C. non-playing staff
Arbroath F.C. players
Newtongrange Star F.C. players
Scottish football managers
British postmen
Civil Service Strollers F.C players